Earl Carr (born January 22, 1955) is a former American football running back. He played for the San Francisco 49ers in 1978 and for the Philadelphia Eagles in 1979.

References

1955 births
Living people
American football running backs
Florida Gators football players
San Francisco 49ers players
Philadelphia Eagles players